Garissone Innocent (born 16 April 2000) is a French professional footballer who plays as a goalkeeper for Belgian Pro League club Eupen.

Club career

Paris Saint-Germain 
Innocent joined Paris Saint-Germain (PSG) in 2015, and signed his first professional contract on 31 May 2018, making him a Parisian player until June 2021.

On 3 October 2019, Innocent signed a two-year contract extension with PSG. He took the role of fourth goalkeeper at Paris Saint-Germain during the 2019–20 season, behind Keylor Navas, Sergio Rico, and Marcin Bułka. The team would go on to win all four domestic competitions and finish runner-up in the UEFA Champions League.

2020–21: Loan to Caen 
On 2 October 2020, Innocent joined Caen on a season-long loan with an option to buy. He made his professional debut in a 3–2 win against Dunkerque on 18 December.

During a match against Chambly on 30 January 2021, Innocent collapsed on the field. He reportedly suffered a tachycardia attack, and was rushed to the hospital. Caen later confirmed that Innocent had regained consciousness, though manager Pascal Dupraz said that the player still "had trouble speaking and breathing." Innocent would remain under observation at the hospital overnight, with his condition remaining stable. The match eventually resulted in a 4–2 victory for Chambly. Coincidentally in the same match, Chambly's goalkeeper Xavier Pinoteau was also taken to the hospital after taking a blow to the head. Innocent made his return to the bench for Caen in a match against Nancy on 2 March. However, he would not make any more appearances for the club for the rest of the season.

2021–22: Loan to Vannes 
On 26 July 2021, Innocent joined Championnat National 2 club Vannes on a season-long loan. According to Vannes's president Maxime Ray, Innocent joined the club as the starting goalkeeper. He had several complicated games with errors, and in December, the club hierarchy chose to replace him as the starting keeper with Clément Pétrel, relegating Innocent to the bench. "We wanted to keep him as a backup", explained Ray. However, Innocent preferred to return to Paris. He played a total of ten matches during his loan in Brittany.

Eupen 
On 1 September 2022, Innocent left PSG, signing for Belgian First Division A club Eupen on a three-year contract.

International career 
Born in France, Innocent is of Haitian descent. In February 2021, he was included in the preliminary squad for the Haiti U23 national team that would compete in the CONCACAF Olympic Qualifying Championship.

Career statistics

References

External links 

 Profile at the Paris Saint-Germain F.C. website
 
 

2000 births
Living people
French footballers
French sportspeople of Haitian descent
Black French sportspeople
Association football goalkeepers
Paris Saint-Germain F.C. players
Stade Malherbe Caen players
Vannes OC players
K.A.S. Eupen players
Championnat National 2 players
Ligue 2 players

People from Ivry-sur-Seine
French expatriate footballers
Expatriate footballers in Belgium
French expatriate sportspeople in Belgium